This is a list of the islands that are named in the Queen Elizabeth Islands. The islands are divided into two major island groups: the Parry Islands and the Sverdrup Islands. The total area of the Queen Elizabeth Islands is about 419,000 square kilometres.

List of Islands

See also
 List of islands of Canada
 List of Canadian islands by area

Notes

 
Queen
Islands
Islands